John Boye (born 23 April 1987) is a Ghanaian professional footballer who plays as a defender.

Club career

Early career
Born in Accra, Boye began his career with Schwepps' youth academy, where he played alongside Mohammed Iddi, he then later went on to play at Pro Consult Sports Academy and Miracle FC.

Heart of Lions and Rennes (loan)
Boye moved to Stade Rennais (Rennes) on 29 July 2008 after a two-week trial, he first arrived at Rennes on loan on 1 September 2008 from Ghana Premier League club Heart of Lions with an option to buy, and returned to Heart of Lions on 30 June 2009.

Boye had long been a target for Rennes, but an early attempt from Rennes to sign him in 2009 broke down when it was claimed that he had already signed a deal with the Israeli club, Hapoel Petach Tikva.

Rennes
In July 2009, the situation had been wrapped up by Heart of Lions, allowing Rennes to complete the move before the summer transfer window 2009 deadline, he signed a contract on 10 July 2009, completing his move from his former club Heart of Lions to Stade Rennais.

Sivasspor
Boye left Turkish side Sivasspor following the expiration of his contract in June 2018.

Metz
On 21 June 2018, FC Metz officially announced the capture of John on a four-year-deal, keeping him at the club till June 2022.

Al-Fayha
On 31 August 2021, Boye joined Al-Fayha on a one-year contract.

International career
On 17 June 2008, Boye was called up for the Ghana, making his debut on 22 June 2008 against Gabon. Boye was included in the Ghana national team's 23-man squad for the 2012 Africa Cup of Nations in January 2012 and he made his tournament debut in the 2012 Africa Cup of Nations match against Botswana on 24 January 2012.

He was part of the 2015 Africa Cup of Nations team that took a silver medal after they lost to Ivory Coast in an 8-9 penalty shoot out.

International appearances

International goals
Scores and results list Ghana's goal tally first, score column indicates score after each Boye goal. Some sources credit Christian Atsu with scoring a goal against Lesotho on 16 June 2013, but FIFA credited it to Boye.

Honours

Sivasspor

 TFF First League: 2016–17
Metz
 Ligue 2: 2018–19
Ghana
Africa Cup of Nations runner-up: 2015
Individual
 Ligue 2 UNFP Team of the Year: 2018–19

References

External links

 
 

1987 births
Living people
Footballers from Accra
Ghanaian footballers
Ghana international footballers
Association football defenders
Association football midfielders
Ghanaian expatriate footballers
Expatriate footballers in France
Expatriate footballers in Saudi Arabia
Expatriate footballers in Turkey
Ghanaian expatriate sportspeople in Saudi Arabia
Ligue 1 players
Ligue 2 players
Süper Lig players
Saudi Professional League players
Heart of Lions F.C. players
Stade Rennais F.C. players
Kayseri Erciyesspor footballers
Sivasspor footballers
FC Metz players
Al-Fayha FC players
2012 Africa Cup of Nations players
2013 Africa Cup of Nations players
2014 FIFA World Cup players
2015 Africa Cup of Nations players
2017 Africa Cup of Nations players
2019 Africa Cup of Nations players